This is the discography of American rock musician Ron "Bumblefoot" Thal.

Albums

Compilations and extended plays

Singles

Video releases
2004: Live at the RMA

Live albums
2014: Appetite for Democracy 3D (with Guns N' Roses)

2019: Live With The Plovdiv Psychotic Symphony (with Sons of Apollo)

Guest appearances

Compilations

Tribute CDs

Other projects

Producer

References 

Discographies of American artists
Rock music discographies